San Justo Department may refer to:
 San Justo Department, Córdoba
 San Justo Department, Santa Fe

Department name disambiguation pages